The 2016 ACC Under-19 Asia Cup was an international cricket tournament that was held in Sri Lanka from 15 to 23 December 2016. It formed part of the qualification process for the 2018 Under-19 World Cup. Eight teams participated in the tournament, with the six Asian teams at the 2016 Under-19 World Cup being joined by the top two teams from the 2016 Asia Division Two event. India won the tournament, beating Sri Lanka by 34 runs in the final.

Teams

Group stage

Group A

Matches

Group B

Matches

Finals

Semi-finals

Final

Statistics

Most runs
The top five runscorers are included in this table, ranked by runs scored and then by batting average.

Source: ESPNcricinfo

Most wickets

The top five wicket takers are listed in this table, ranked by wickets taken and then by bowling average.

Source: ESPNcricinfo

References

External links
 Tournament homepage at ESPNcricinfo

International cricket competitions in 2016–17
International cricket competitions in Sri Lanka
2016 in Asian sport
2016 in Sri Lankan cricket
Under-19 regional cricket tournaments